My Beautiful Laundrette is a play by Hanif Kureishi based on the 1985 film of the same name with a screenplay also by Kureishi.

Production history 
The play premiered at the Curve in Leicester from 20 September to 5 October 2019 before touring to Everyman Theatre, Cheltenham (8 to 12 October), Leeds Playhouse (15 to 26 October), Belgrade Theatre, Coventry (29 October to 2 November) and Birmingham Repertory Theatre (5 to 9 November). The play was directed by Nikolai Foster and featured original music by Tennant/Lowe from Pet Shop Boys.

On 28 August 2020, Curve announced it would be releasing an archive recording of the dress rehearsal of the production on its website from 2 September until when the theatre can re-open due to the COVID-19 pandemic.

Cast and characters

References 

2019 plays
British plays
Plays based on films
Plays set in London